Donacia thalassina is a species of leaf beetle of the subfamily Donaciinae. Distributed in the Palearctic region.

References

External links
Raduzhnitsa Donacia thalassina Germ. (Chrysomelidae) — atlas of beetles of Russia — photo by KV Makarov

Beetles of Asia
Beetles described in 1811
Donaciinae